Timothy David Noakes (born 1949) is a South African scientist, and an emeritus professor in the Division of Exercise Science and Sports Medicine at the University of Cape Town. 

He has run more than 70 marathons and ultramarathons, and is the author of several books on exercise and diet. He is known for his work in sports science and for his support of a low-carbohydrate, high-fat (LCHF, Banting) diet, as set out in his books The Real Meal Revolution and Lore of Nutrition: Challenging Conventional Dietary Beliefs.

Background
Noakes was born in Salisbury, Southern Rhodesia (today Harare, Zimbabwe) in 1949 and moved to South Africa at the age of five. His father had arrived in what was then Southern Rhodesia in 1946, establishing a successful tobacco exporting company that he sold in 1954. As a young boy his main sporting interest was cricket. Noakes attended boarding school at Monterey Preparatory School in Constantia, Cape Town. One year was spent as a foreign exchange student at Huntington Park High School in Huntington Park, California. Prep school was followed by Diocesan College. He has earned an MBChB (1974), MD (1981), and DSc (Med) (2002).

Research
In 1980 Noakes was tasked to start a sports science course at the University of Cape Town.  Noakes went on to head the Medical Research Council-funded Bioenergetics of Exercise Research Unit, which was later changed to the MRC/UCT Research Unit for Exercise Science and Sports Medicine.

In the early 1990s Noakes co-founded the Sports Science Institute of South Africa, with former South African rugby player Morne du Plessis.

He is a leading researcher on the condition now known as exercise-associated hyponatremia (EAH). He first recognised this condition in a female runner during the 1984 Comrades Marathon, and published his findings in 1985 in the journal Medicine and Science in Sports and Exercise. Noakes hosted the 1st International Exercise-Associated Hyponatremia Consensus Development Conference in Cape Town in May 2005.

In 1996 Noakes published his theory of the "central governor". The theory proposed that fatigue is a "protective emotion" rather than a physiological state.

In 2005 he undertook a series of experiments in the Arctic and Antarctic on South African (British-born) swimmer Lewis Gordon Pugh to understand human capability in extreme cold.  He discovered that Pugh had the ability to raise his core body temperature before entering the water in anticipation of the cold and coined the phrase 'anticipatory thermo-genesis' to describe it. In 2007, Noakes was the expedition doctor for Pugh's one kilometre swim at the Geographic North Pole.

Opinions on health
Noakes is an advocate of a low-carbohydrate, high-fat diet, often referred to in South Africa as the "Noakes" or "Banting" diet. Noakes has characterised mainstream dietary advice as "genocide".

In February 2014 a registered dietician complained to the Health Professions Council of South Africa (HPCSA) that Noakes tweeted to a mother that she should wean her baby onto low-carbohydrate, high-fat foods, which he described as real foods.  The HPCSA held a hearing about the allegation against Noakes over the next few years.  Controversially, on 28 October 2016, the HPSCA incorrectly released a statement announcing that Noakes had been found guilty of misconduct. In a second press release issued over three hours later, the HPSCA apologised for the mistake. Noakes was cleared of misconduct in April 2017. The HPSCA lost its appeal in June 2018.

In August 2014, Noakes sent a tweet to his 46,000 Twitter followers which said: "Dishonest science. Proven link between autism and early immunisation covered up?". The tweet included a link to a video from disgraced ex-doctor and anti-vaccine activist Andrew Wakefield, in which Wakefield was repeating the conspiracy theory that the CDC is covering-up a link between vaccination and autism. Subsequently challenged on Twitter, Noakes responded that he personally had "no opinion" on the matter.

Noakes co-wrote the 2017 book Lore of Nutrition with journalist Marika Sboros. In it Noakes describes his conversion to low-carbohydrate dieting, explores how the lipid hypothesis is the "biggest mistake in modern medicine" and details his struggles with the medical establishment. In a review for Medical Brief, paediatrician Alastair McAlpine described the book as "an extraordinarily heady mix of conspiracy theory, bad science, bad writing, and persecution complex".

Awards and achievements
In 1996 he was honoured by the American College of Sports Medicine when he was asked to present the J.B. Wolfe Memorial Lecture, the college's keynote address at its annual meeting. In 2002 he was awarded a Doctorate in Science (DSc). In 2002 Noakes was awarded the International Cannes Grand Prix Award for Research in Medicine and Water, for his work on Exercise-associated hyponatremia (EAH). In 2004 Runner's World (USA) included this work as one of the 40 most important "persons or events" in the sport of running in the past 40 years. In 2008 he was elected an honorary fellow of the Faculty of Sports and Exercise Medicine (UK), the first foreigner to be so recognised. In that year he also received the Order of Mapungubwe (Silver), from the President of South Africa for his "excellent contribution in the field of sports and the science of physical exercise". In 2011 Noakes was awarded an honorary doctorate by the Vrije Universiteit Amsterdam, Netherlands. In 2012 he received the Lifetime Achievement Award from South Africa's National Research Foundation for his contribution to sports science research. In 2014 the Southern Africa Association for the Advancement of Science (S2A3) awarded Noakes their prestigious South Africa Medal (gold) for his outstanding contributions to sport physiology.

Selected publications
Noakes has written several books detailing his research in sports science and nutrition. A selected bibliography is given below.

Lore of Running (1986)
Running Injuries: How to Prevent and Overcome Them (1990)
Bob Woolmer's Art and Science of Cricket (2008)
Challenging Beliefs: Memoirs of a Career (2012)
Waterlogged: The Serious Problem of Overhydration in Endurance Sports (2012)
The Real Meal Revolution (2014)
Raising Superheroes (2015)
Lore of Nutrition: Challenging Conventional Dietary Beliefs, with Marika Sboros (2017)
Real Food On Trial: How the diet dictators tried to destroy a top scientist, with Marika Sboros (2019)

References

1949 births
Alumni of Diocesan College, Cape Town
Exercise physiologists
High-fat diet advocates
Living people
Low-carbohydrate diet advocates
People from Harare
Sports scientists
Academic staff of the University of Cape Town
University of Cape Town alumni
South African scientists
White South African people